Beqir Balluku (14 February 1917 – 5 November 1975) was an Albanian politician, military leader, and Minister of Defense of Albania. Balluku assisted Enver Hoxha in carrying out the 1956 purge within the Party of Labour. However, in 1974, Balluku himself, along with a group of other government members was accused by Hoxha of an attempted coup d'état against the Albanian People's Republic. He was executed the next year.

Biography
Balluku was born on 14 February 1917 in Tirana, Albania. He studied at a technical high school in Tirana. While he was doing his military service, he joined the ranks of the Albanian resistance against the Axis during the partisan war in Albania.

On 20 May 1943 he was appointed commander of the Communist partisan battalion "Krujë Ishëm", and on 18 September 1943 he was named commissar of the third brigade. Later he was appointed commander of the second brigade.

On 28 January 1948 Balluku was named Chief of the Head Command of the Albanian Army. In 1948, in the first Congress of the Party of Labour of Albania (formerly the Communist Party of Albania), he was elected as a member of the Politburo, a post he held until his arrest, and in 1952 he was named Minister of Defense. One year later he gained the military rank of Lieutenant General. From 1948 to 1974 he was a member of the Albanian parliament.

In 1953 he graduated from the Marshal Voroshilov Military Academy of the USSR Army General Staff. Earlier, in December 1952 the Yugoslav State radio of Belgrade and the newspaper Politika had announced that he had been killed and his family interned, but it turned out that it was just speculation: he had been busy with his studies in Moscow.

In 1956 Balluku was presiding over the municipality of Tirana Conference of the Communist Party when the opponents of the Enver Hoxha - Mehmet Shehu regime nearly overthrew the government. Balluku informed Nexhmije Hoxha (Hoxha's wife) that Enver Hoxha should return from the holidays and keep the situation under control.

Shehu and Balluku's intervention helped cause the 1956 purge of the Albanian Communist Party. After Hoxha returned to Tirana, he first tried to be conciliatory towards his critics and then he retaliated by ordering the arrest of all of those who had spoken up. The troika Hoxha-Shehu-Balluku was so described by Nikita Khrushchev, then First Secretary of the Communist Party of the Soviet Union:

In 1960, following the Sino-Soviet split, Balluku, as a representative of the Albanian Party of Labour, took a strong pro-Chinese and anti-Soviet stand in his speech at the Congress of the North Vietnam Communist Party.

Coup d'état accusation, arrest, and execution
In July 1974, after 22 uninterrupted years of service as the Minister of Defense of the People's Republic of Albania, Balluku himself was accused by Enver Hoxha of being the instigator of revisionist ideas and was put on trial, accused of a military coup d'état and high treason against his own country. Balluku was sentenced to death along with Petrit Dume, Hito Çako and Rrahman Perrllaku.

Political analysts and scholars seem to agree that Hoxha was aware of the military establishment's desire to decrease the Party's influence in the areas of the military and the economy. Their attempt to downgrade Hoxha's concept of the people's war was rewarded when Hoxha deposed the entire top level of the military establishment, including the Minister of Defense, Balluku. Hoxha seems to have feared a coup d'état. Balluku was then ranked as the fourth member of the ruling Communist Party (after Enver Hoxha, Mehmet Shehu and Hysni Kapo)

In the 6 October 1974 elections for the People's Assembly, Balluku was the only leading Albanian politician not reelected (in his home district of Shkodër). The removal of Balluku from the Albanian Politburo had already been disclosed in a report from Belgrade on 11 September 1974.

Twelve days later, John A. Volpe, the US Ambassador to Italy, reported through a telegram sent to Washington that it was possible that Balluku and other high defense functionaries had been removed from their posts. The first indication was a discrepancy between Hoxha's and Balluku's opinions on the defense system of Albania; the second was a request from Beijing to Hoxha that he remove Balluku, who was making too many requests on weapons imports from People's Republic of China. The third possibility was the coup d'état intent of Balluku, possibly endorsed by the other pro-Soviet Union defense high functionaries.

Balluku was executed by firing squad on 5 November 1975.

Balluku's remains were retrieved only 26 years later, on 18 July 2000, on request of his family members. He had been put in a secret common grave in Vranisht, Vlorë County, together with the other two former Albanian generals (Dume and Çako) who had also been accused by Hoxha in 1974.

In 1979, following the ideological split of the Party of Labour of Albania from the Communist Party of China, Enver Hoxha wrote in his memories that the "enemy groups" of Abdyl Këllezi (Minister of the Economy) and Beqir Balluku (Minister of Defense) had drafted their inimical plan based on suggestions from Zhou Enlai, who was Premier of the People's Republic of China.

References

Sources
 

1917 births
1974 deaths
Politicians from Tirana
Labour Party of Albania politicians
Members of the Politburo of the Labour Party of Albania
Members of the Parliament of Albania
Deputy Prime Ministers of Albania
Government ministers of Albania
Defence ministers of Albania
Albanian military personnel
Albanian soldiers
Albanian expatriates in the Soviet Union
Military Academy of the General Staff of the Armed Forces of the Soviet Union alumni
People executed by Albania by firing squad
Albanian people executed by the communist regime